Dey's may refer to:

 Dey's (company), a department store located in and around Syracuse, New York
 Dey's Arena, a series of ice rinks and arenas located in Ottawa, Ontario
 Dey's Medical, a pharmaceutical and ayurvedic medicine manufacturer in India

See also

 Day (disambiguation)
 Daze (disambiguation)
 Dey (disambiguation)